San Pablo Macuiltianguis is a town and municipality in Oaxaca in south-western Mexico. It is part of the Ixtlán District in the Sierra Norte region. 

As of 2010, the municipality had a total population of 371.

Macuiltianguis Zapotec, a variety of Sierra Juárez Zapotec, is spoken in the town.

References

Sources
Foreman, John. 2006. The Morphosyntax of Subjects in Macuiltianguis Zapotec. Ph.D. Dissertation, UCLA.

Municipalities of Oaxaca